Neuromancer is a 1984 novel by William Gibson.

Neuromancer may also refer to:
 Neuromancer (video game), 1988 video game
 Neuromance, 2005 studio album
 The Neuromancer (album), 2014 studio album